Bi Hongyong (born 16 November 1974) is a retired Chinese high jumper. He finished twelfth at the 1995 World Championships, clearing only  after jumping  in the qualification round. He won the Asian Junior Championships in 1992. He is a two-time national champion for PR China in the men's high jump event.

Achievements

External links

1974 births
Living people
Chinese male high jumpers